The 2016–17 Oregon State Beavers women's basketball team represented Oregon State University during the 2016–17 NCAA Division I women's basketball season. The Beavers, led by seventh year head coach Scott Rueck, played their games at the Gill Coliseum and were members of the Pac-12 Conference. They finished the season 31–5, 16–2 in Pac-12 play to win Pac-12 regular season title. They advanced to the championship game Pac-12 women's tournament where they lost to Stanford. They received an at-large bid of the NCAA women's tournament where they defeated Long Beach State and Creighton in the first and second rounds before losing to Florida State in the sweet sixteen.

Roster

Schedule

|-
!colspan=9 style="background:#c34500; color:black;"| Exhibition

|-
!colspan=9 style="background:#c34500; color:black;"| Non-conference regular season

|-
!colspan=9 style="background:#c34500; color:black;"| Pac-12 regular season

|-
!colspan=9 style="background:#c34500;"|Pac-12 Women's Tournament

|-
!colspan=9 style="background:#c34500;"|NCAA Women's Tournament

Rankings

See also
2016–17 Oregon State Beavers men's basketball team

References

Oregon State Beavers women's basketball seasons
Oregon State
Oregon State
2016 in sports in Oregon
2017 in sports in Oregon